Typhoon Parma, known in the Philippines as Typhoon Pepeng, was the second typhoon to affect the Philippines within the span of a week during September 2009.

Typhoon Parma was assigned by PAGASA as Pepeng, when it entered the Philippine Area of Responsibility days after Typhoon Ketsana wreaked havoc on the country. Parma spared the capital and instead lashed the northern part of Luzon island.

Parma added to the damage caused by the earlier Typhoon Ketsana, affecting thousands of families on the north, especially on Pangasinan province where the San Roque Dam inadvertently released water to prevent its breach. However, in the first week of October, Parma interacted with the incoming Typhoon Melor on the Pacific (via a Fujiwhara interaction), rendering it stationary as it made landfall on Southern Taiwan. Days later, the greatly weakened Parma retreated back to Luzon making further landfalls on Ilocos Norte and Cagayan. The now severe tropical storm Parma then began to wane its strength as it crossed Luzon island for the second time. It then emerged on the South China Sea as a tropical depression. Parma became one of the deadliest typhoons to hit the Philippines in a decade.

Meteorological history

During September 26, the Joint Typhoon Warning Center (JTWC) started to monitor an area of convection that was located about 445 km (275 mi), to the southeast of Guam. The system had an elongated low-level circulation center with convection developing around the center. Upper level analysis showed that the system was located in an area of low vertical wind shear and had a good poleward outflow into a tropical upper tropospheric trough. During the next day, convection started to consolidate before both the Japan Meteorological Agency (JMA) and the JTWC initiated advisories on the system, with the JTWC designating it as Tropical Depression 19W. After being classified, the depression remained weak and poorly organized, as it lay close to Tropical Storm 18W. During September 28, as the depression moved away from 18W, the JTWC reported that the depression had intensified into a tropical storm despite it remaining poorly organized, and acquired the name Parma.

Parma started to intensify to a typhoon as it moved closer to the Philippines. Afterwards, Parma started a weakening trend as it moved closer to the Philippines, and on October 3 made landfall northern luzon, Philippines. During its landfall in the Philippines, Parma began to travel northwest towards China. It slowed down and weakened (due to interactions with Typhoon Melor), then turned back south towards the Philippines. It weakened to a tropical depression before emerging off the east coast of Luzon on October 7, remaining stationary for a day. On October 8 it made a third landfall the eastern coast of Cagayan, then moved slowly across Luzon, eventually emerging in the South China Sea. It then made a final landfall in Vietnam on October 13, and dissipated over the country on October 14.

Preparations

Caroline Islands

Early on September 28, the National Weather Service Weather Forecast Office in Guam using data from the Joint Typhoon Warning Center placed Ulithi, Faraulep and Fais under tropical storm warnings and declared Tropical storm watches for Yap and Ngulu whilst the depression was moving towards the state of Yap. Tropical storm warnings were then declared for Yap and Ngulu later that morning as the depression was moving to the northwest of Faraulep. These warnings stayed in effect until early the next day when they canceled the warnings for Faraulep, Fais and Ulithi after the depression had intensified into a named storm, and had passed by the islands. NWS Guam then placed Koror and Kayangel under a tropical storm watch later that day before cancelling all warnings early on September 30.

Philippines

The National Disaster Coordinating Council (NDCC) advised all local government officials across Luzon to evacuate people if needed to ensure their safety. In addition to the NDCC, they gave out relief goods and other necessities. President Gloria Macapagal Arroyo also requested PAGASA to monitor the super typhoon every two hours and update its website. Also, the Philippine Atmospheric, Geophysical and Astronomical Services Administration (PAGASA) advised all areas with public storm signals to be alerted against storm surges, landslides, and flash floods. The Coast Guard placed the entire country under red alert, meaning that the agency would monitor the whole country, especially Northern and Central Luzon. All ferry stations with routes from Luzon to Visayas and vice versa suspended operations, and
fishermen were advised not to go to sea to avoid turbulent waves.

As preparations continued, different dams were opened and large amounts of water freed to avoid the overflowing of dams. In Isabela, the Magat Dam released a large amount of water. Its water was projected to pass through Cagayan River, forcing locals along the river to evacuate. The Angat Dam in Bulacan also released large amounts of water, flooding the towns of Calumpit and Hagonoy. Local officials took evacuated people living in the area. Five barangays in Nueva Ecija were already flooded due to water from Pantabangan Dam, which released 250 cubic meters per second from 1 pm on October 1, 05:00 (UTC) to 1 am on October 2, 17:00 (UTC). Local officials  also took charge to evacuate people. In Laguna, the Caliraya Dam released water as a precaution against Parma's heavy rains, even though Laguna would not be directly affected by the super typhoon. On the morning of October 2, President Gloria Macapagal — Arroyo declared the whole country under a state of calamity.

In Metro Manila, billboards were rolled down due to strong winds that were anticipated. Air travel, cargo ships, and other water transport throughout the Islands were suspended. The Commission on Higher Education (CHED) suspended classes for regions 1, 2, 3, 4a, 4b, 5 and CAR. In Laguna, the Laguna Lake Development Authority (LLDA) evacuated a massive 100,000 residents that live near the Laguna lake.

Taiwan
Following the devastating impacts of Typhoon Morakot in August, residents in southern Taiwan were weary upon hearing of a new typhoon approaching the region. By October 3, residents of six villages in the hard hit county of Kaohsiung began evacuating. The following day, the Central Weather Bureau issued a land warning for the Hengchun Peninsula as Parma moved over the northern Philippines. Residents in the region were advised to prepare for heavy rains and high winds in relation to the storm. At least 55 international flights from Taiwanese airports were cancelled or delayed due to Typhoon Parma as it stalled in the Bashih Channel. On October 5, mandatory evacuations were put in place for portions of southern Taiwan, leading to roughly 6,000 residents leaving the area for shelter. Emergency officials deployed 200 elite soldiers to the region to assist in the evacuation and placed 35,000 more on standby for relief operations.

Impact

Caroline Islands

While it was a Tropical Storm, Parma passed to the south of the westernmost state of Yap, battering the east coast of the main island with torrential rain and winds of up to 95 km/h (60 mph). As a result, Continental Micronesia cancelled its scheduled passenger flight to Guam, while the governor of Yap ordered that government employees stay at home and that residents take all precautions that were possible while placing Yap under the highest state of storm alerts.

Philippines

Even though Parma was still too far to make its landfall in northern Philippines, various transportation was suspended before the super typhoon draw near. In Catanduanes, where the first signal warning no.3 was raised, the province's power and communications were cut. Fallen trees were already in the main roads. About 30,000 families were evacuated. In addition also to the Bicol region, more than 2,000 passengers were stranded in ferry stations. 39 provinces including Metro Manila were put to signal warnings, with each place experienced massive rainfall with strong winds. Parma made its landfall at Northeastern Cagayan at 3:00pm PST/07:00 (UTC).  In Cagayan, at least 6,036 people in 39 barangays (villages) were affected, while P20.33 million worth of agricultural produce were destroyed. Also, in the Chico River was swelled due to the typhoon, making the Maguilling Overflow Bridge along the Cagayan–Apayao Road impassable. The Maharlika Highway in Ilagan, Isabela to Cagayan became hardly passable due to the trees and electric posts that fell when Pepeng battered the area. Total power interruption also crippled the provinces of Kalinga, Apayao, and the northern towns of Isabela. In Kalinga, landslides were reported on roads linking the provincial capital, Tabuk, to upland towns. In Zambales, at least 2,100 families were evacuated as Pepeng brought heavy rains causing the Bucao River to swell. The Carael section of the Zambales highway became impassable due to rising floodwaters. Due to heavy downpour, the San Roque Dam in Eastern Pangasinan and Pantabangan Dam in Nueva Ecija was forced to release huge amount of water. It caused major flooding in Tarlac which is their neighbouring province and also caused flooding Eastern and Central Pangasinan as well as Nueva Ecija. In Metro Manila the area is still experienced torrential rains and strong winds. Floodwaters continue to rise in some areas in Metro Manila and Calabarzon. In Pateros, Muntinlupa, and Taguig, in Taytay town in Rizal province, and in the towns of Biñan and San Pedro in Laguna province, the flood is not subsiding. Laguna de Bay is breaking a 90-year record in meters of water, which threatens to submerge more areas in Metro Manila. In Benguet, a landslide killed at least 200 as Tropical Depression Parma continues to bring rain across northern Luzon. Due to severe flooding, Leptospirosis became a problem that affected many. In Pasig City General Hospital alone, 30 people have been taken in for diagnosis. The Department of Health announced that there is a Leptospirosis outbreak in Marikina.

Taiwan
Torrential rainfall fell across southern Taiwan as Typhoon Parma stalled south of the island. These floods prompted emergency evacuations in hundreds of villages throughout Taiwan. After  of rain fell in Yilan County, emergency officials enacted the first mandatory evacuation in northern Taiwan, relocating hundreds of residents. Several landslides were reported in mountainous regions, mainly in southern parts of the island. Military convoys loaded with sandbags traveled to rising rivers to help reinforce them and prevent them from overflowing their banks. As a result of the continuous rainfall and cloud cover, temperatures across Taiwan fell below average.

Off the coast of Taiwan, a ship carrying 14 people sank after being battered by rough seas produced by Typhoon Parma. One person was confirmed dead, three were rescued and ten others were listed as missing.

China
Off the cost of Hainan Island, a ship carrying nine people capsized. Three people were confirmed to have drowned, five were rescued and one other remains missing.

Vietnam
Typhoon Parma made its final landfall near Hai Phong on October 15 after causing damage to Bach Long Vi island where 62 fishing boats were sunk. No deaths were reported.

Retirement
Due to the large number of fatalities and damage caused by the storm, the names Parma and Pepeng were later retired. The committee selected the name In-fa to replace "Parma" on the Western Pacific basin name lists beginning in 2011. For the PAGASA, on 2012, the name chosen to replace "Pepeng" was Paolo for the 2013 season.

See also
 Effects of the 2009 Pacific typhoon season in the Philippines
 List of wettest tropical cyclones
 Typhoons in the Philippines
 Timeline of the 2009 Pacific typhoon season
 Tropical Storm Thelma (Uring, 1991) – second deadliest tropical cyclone to strike the Philippines
 Tropical Depression Winnie, 2004
 Typhoon Durian (Reming, 2006)
 Typhoon Xangsane (Milenyo, 2006)
 Typhoon Ketsana (Ondoy, 2009) – a typhoon that hit Central Luzon just one week before Parma
 Typhoon Megi (Juan, 2010)
 Tropical Storm Washi (Sendong, 2011)
 Typhoon Son-Tinh (Ofel, 2012)
 Typhoon Bopha (Pablo, 2012)
 Typhoon Usagi (Odette, 2013)
 Typhoon Krosa (Vinta, 2013)
 Typhoon Haiyan (Yolanda, 2013) – deadliest tropical cyclone to strike the Philippines in the 21st Century
 Typhoon Vongfong (Ambo, 2020)
 Typhoon Goni (Rolly, 2020)

References

External links

RSMC Tokyo - Typhoon Center
Best Track Data of Typhoon Parma (0917) 
Best Track Data (Graphics) of Typhoon Parma (0917)
Best Track Data (Text)
JTWC Best Track Data of Super Typhoon 19W (Parma)
19W.PARMA from the U.S. Naval Research Laboratory

2009 Pacific typhoon season
2009 in Vietnam
Typhoons in China
Typhoons in Taiwan
Typhoons in Vietnam
Pepeng
Pepeng
Typhoons
Retired Pacific typhoons
Retired Philippine typhoon names
2009 in China
2009 in Taiwan
Parma